Prince Zolile Burns-Ncamashe Aa! Zweliyajika! (born 1965 or 1966) is the son of Chief Sipho Burns-Ncamashe Aa! Zilimbola!, a South African politician and a member of the South African National Assembly for the African National Congress. Following the death of ANC MP Tozama Mantashe, he assumed a position in the National Assembly as the next MP on ANC's Eastern Cape list.

On 6 March 2023, Burns-Ncamashe was appointed as Deputy Minister of Cooperative Governance and Traditional Affairs.

Education
Burns-Ncamashe has a Bachelor of Arts degree majoring in philosophy and psychology, an honours degree in philosophy and a master's degree in social sciences from the University of Fort Hare in Alice, Eastern Cape. He is currently a part-time candidate for a doctorate in social sciences specialising on the question of land at Fort Hare.

Career
He was a member of the Eastern Cape House of Traditional Leaders from 1996 to 2017 and served as the deputy chairperson of the provincial house between 2002 and 2017. He was sworn in as a member of the National House of Traditional Leaders in 1997 by president Nelson Mandela.

Burns-Ncamashe had been an advisor, counsellor and spokesperson to the AmaRharhabe royal family. He served under King Maxhob'ayakhawuleza Sandile until his death in 2011, then he also served under the Regent of the Royal House of the AmaRharhabe, Queen Noloyiso Sandile for multiple years until her death from COVID-19 in 2020. He then went on to serve under King Jonguxolo Sandile.

Political career
Burns-Ncamashe is a member of the African National Congress. In the 2019 parliamentary election, he stood for the National Assembly as 22nd on the ANC parliamentary list in the Eastern Cape. He was not elected to the National Assembly at the election.

On 31 January 2021, ANC MP Tozama Mantashe died from COVID-19 complications. The ANC chose Burns-Ncamashe to take up her seat in the National Assembly. He was sworn in on 19 February 2021. On 24 February 2021, he became a member of the Portfolio Committee on Trade and Industry.

On 6 March 2023, Burns-Ncamashe was appointed as Deputy Minister of Cooperative Governance and Traditional Affairs.

References

External links

Profile at Parliament of South Africa

Living people
Xhosa people
Year of birth missing (living people)
People from the Eastern Cape
African National Congress politicians
Members of the National Assembly of South Africa
University of Fort Hare alumni